The 105th Illinois Volunteer Infantry Regiment was an infantry formation of the United States Volunteers during the American Civil War.

Service
The 105th Illinois Infantry was organized at Dixon, Illinois, and mustered in for three years service on September 2, 1862, under the command of Colonel Daniel Dustin.  It was recruited in DeKalb and DuPage counties.

The regiment was attached to Ward's Brigade, Dumont's 12th Division, Army of the Ohio, to November 1862. Ward's Brigade, Post of Gallatin, Tennessee, Department of the Cumberland, to June 1863. 2nd Brigade, 3rd Division, Reserve Corps, Department of the Cumberland, to August 1863. Ward's Brigade, Post of Nashville, Tennessee, Department of the Cumberland, to January 1864. 1st Brigade, 1st Division, XI Corps, Army of the Cumberland, to April 1864. 1st Brigade, 3rd Division, XX Corps, Army of the Cumberland and Army of Georgia to June 1865.

The 105th Illinois Infantry mustered out of service on June 7, 1865, and discharged at Chicago, Illinois, on July 17, 1865.

Detailed service
Moved from Dixon to Camp Douglas, Illinois, September 8, 1862, then to Louisville, Kentucky, September 30-October 2. March to Frankfort, Kentucky, October 3–9, 1862, then to Lawrenceburg in pursuit of John Hunt Morgan, October 10–13. Moved to Bowling Green, Kentucky, October 26-November 4. To Scottsville November 11, to Gallatin, Tennessee, November 25; to South Tunnel December 11 and duty there until February 1, 1863. At Gallatin until June 1. Moved to Lavergne, then to Murfreesboro July 2. Return to Lavergne July 29; then moved to Nashville, Tennessee, August 19, and duty there until February 24, 1864. March to Wauhatchie Valley, Tennessee, February 24-March 10, and duty there until May 2. Atlanta Campaign May 2-September 8. Demonstrations on Resaca May 8–13. Battle of Resaca May 14–15. Cassville May 19. Advance on Dallas May 23–25. Burnt Hickory May 25. Operations on line of Pumpkin Vine Creek and battles about Dallas, New Hope Church, and Allatoona Hills May 26-June 5. Operations about Marietta and against Kennesaw Mountain June 10-July 2. Pine Hill June 11–14. Lost Mountain June 15–17. Gilgal (or Golgotha Church) June 15. Muddy Creek June 17. Noyes Creek June 19. Kolb's Farm June 22. Assault on Kennesaw June 27. Ruff's Station, Smyrna Camp Ground, July 4. Chattahoochie River July 5–17. Peachtree Creek July 19–20. Siege of Atlanta July 22-August 25. Operations at Chattahoochie River Bridge August 26-September 2. Occupation of Atlanta September 2-November 15. March to the sea November 15-December 10. Siege of Savannah December 10–21. Carolinas Campaign January to April 1865. Near Hardeesville, South Carolina, January 3. Lawtonville, South Carolina, February 2. Salkehatchie February 3–5. Averyshore, Taylor's Hole Creek, North Carolina, March 16. Battle of Bentonville March 19–21. Occupation of Goldsboro March 24. Advance on Raleigh April 10–14. Bennett's House April 26. Surrender of Johnston and his army. March to Washington, D.C., via Richmond, Virginia, April 29-May 19. Grand Review of the Armies May 24.

Casualties
The regiment lost a total of 238 men during service; 2 officers and 49 enlisted men killed or mortally wounded, 187 enlisted men died of disease.

See also

 List of Illinois Civil War units

References
 Cram, George Franklin. Soldiering with Sherman: Civil War Letters of George F. Cram (DeKalb, IL: Northern Illinois University Press), 2000.  
 Dyer, Frederick H. A Compendium of the War of the Rebellion (Des Moines, IA: Dyer Pub. Co.), 1908.

External links
 Roster of the 105th Illinois Infantry

Military units and formations established in 1862
Military units and formations disestablished in 1865
Units and formations of the Union Army from Illinois
1862 establishments in Illinois